Leo Segun Ajiborisha  served as the first Administrator of Osun State, Nigeria after it was created from part of Oyo State in August 1991 during the military regime of General Ibrahim Babangida.

One of Ajiborisha's first actions as Osun Governor was to establish the Osun State Broadcasting Corporation. The radio channel based in Ile-Ife came on air on 25 November 1991
He inaugurated the Osun State Civil Service Commission on 30 September 1991. 
He handed over to the elected civilian governor Isiaka Adetunji Adeleke in January 1992 at the start of the Nigerian Third Republic.

Later he became Director of Operations, Defence Headquarters, and then Principal Staff Officer to General Abdulsalami Abubakar (1998–1999).
As a former military administrator, he was required to retire from the army in June 1999 at the start of the Nigerian Fourth Republic,

In April 2008 the Economic and Financial Crimes Commission cleared Leo Ajiborisa of allegations of corrupt practices related to acquisition of an oil block by two Lagos-based companies. 
In 2010 he was President and Chairman-in-Council of the Institute of Strategic Management, Nigeria.

References

Nigerian generals
Living people
Yoruba military personnel
Governors of Osun State
Yoruba politicians
Year of birth missing (living people)